The 8th International Emmy Kids Awards ceremony, presented by the International Academy of Television Arts and Sciences (IATAS), took place on March 31, 2020. The nominations were announced on October 14, 2019.

The year 2020 was exceptional for the International Emmy Kids Awards with Academy hosting two ceremonies online for the first time in same year.

Ceremony information
Nominations for the 8th International Emmy Kids Awards were announced on October 14, 2019 by the International Academy of Television Arts and Sciences (IATAS) during a press conference at MIPCOM in Cannes, France. The winners were announced on March 31, 2020. The winners spanned series from Australia, Belgium, Brazil, Norway, the Netherlands and the United Kingdom. Due to the COVID-19 pandemic, International Academy canceled the 
award ceremony and the winners were announced via Facebook, Twitter and Instagram.

Winners

References

External links 
 International Academy of Television Arts and Sciences website

International Emmy Kids Awards ceremonies
International Emmy Kids Awards
International Emmy Kids Awards
International Emmy Kids Awards